The Liberal Opposition (LE) was a political party in Hungary during the early 1920s.

History
The party first contested national elections in 1922, winning a single seat in the parliamentary elections that year. It did not contest any further elections.

References

Defunct political parties in Hungary